Dobrodošao u klub is the eleventh studio album by Croatian recording artist Severina, which was released in December 2012 by Dallas Records. Dobrodošao u Klub Tour stands out as the successful tour. Songs from the album have collected more than 260 million views on the YouTube.

Track listing
"Dobrodošao u klub" (Welcome to the Club)
"Ko me tjero" (Who Forced Me)
"Uzbuna" (Alarm)
"Italiana"
"Kradeš sve" (You Steal Everything)
"Slaba na slabića" (Falling for a Weakling)
"Kamen oko vrata" (Rock Around the Neck)
"Grad bez ljudi" (The City Without People)
"Ostavljena" (Left Alone)
"Brad Pitt"
"Postelja od vina" (A Wine Bed)
"Tarapana" (Turmoil)
"Tango"

References

External links

2012 albums
Severina (singer) albums